The Ykkönen 2011 season began on 28 April 2011 and ended on 22 October 2011.

The winner team will qualify directly for promotion to Veikkausliiga 2012. The bottom 4 teams will qualify directly for relegation to Kakkonen.

Overview

A total of thirteen teams will contest in the league, including ten sides from the 2010 season, FC Lahti who was relegated from Veikkausliiga, AC Oulu who was refused a license for Veikkausliiga and HIFK who promoted from Kakkonen after winning the promotion play-offs.

Managerial changes

League table

Results

Statistics
Updated to games played on 22 October 2011.

Top scorers
Source: soccerway.com

References

External links
 Official site 

Ykkönen seasons
2011 in Finnish football leagues
Fin
Fin